Korra is a town in the Jehanabad district, Bihar state, India.  Its PIN is 804406.

References

Cities and towns in Jehanabad district